Kessel may refer to:

Places
Kessel, Belgium
Kessel-Lo, Belgium
Kessel, Germany, part of Goch
Kessel, Limburg, Netherlands
Kessel, North Brabant, Netherlands
Kessel, West Virginia, United States
Kessel (river), a river in Bavaria, Germany

People
 Kessel (surname)

Other uses
 Kessel, a pocket of encircled military units
KFC Kessel, a Belgian football team
Kessel Food Markets, a defunct grocery store chain
Kessel (Star Wars), a planet in the Star Wars franchise

See also 
 Kessels
 Kettle (disambiguation)
 Kessler (name)